Skills like This is a 2007 comedy film directed by Monty Miranda, written by Spencer Berger and distributed by Shadow Distribution released theatrically on March 20, 2009. The DVD released on November 17, 2009  and the Premium Cable premiere on Starz and Starz On Demand 1.1. 2010.  It stars Berger, Gabriel Tigerman, Kerry Knuppe and Brian D. Phelan.

Accolades
SXSW Film Festival "Best narrative feature audience award" 
Edinburgh International Film Festival "Best of the fest" 
Warsaw International Film Festival "Free spirit" - Special Jury Award Nomination 
Jacksonville Film Festival "Jury prize award for BestUSA feature narrative"

Cast
 Spencer Berger as Max Solomon
 Brian D. Phelan as Tommy
 Gabriel Tigerman as Dave
 Kerry Knuppe as Lucy
 Jennifer Batter as Lauren

Production
Spencer Berger both wrote and acts in the film. It was directed by first-time film director Monty Miranda, who previously directed television commercials, short films and created a TV series

The movie was shot in Denver, Colorado.  Principal photography was completed in 17 days.

In addition to highlighting Denver, Colorado's eclectic music scene,  Skills Like This is an entirely
Colorado based production. Skills Like This is the first feature-length film produced in Colorado, by Colorado
filmmakers to be picked up for North American theatrical distribution.

Reception
The film won the award for Best Narrative Feature at the South by Southwest film festival.
The film won the "Best of Fest" distinction at the Edinburgh International Film Festival
The film won the "Jury Prize for Best USA Feature Film" at Jacksonville Film Festival

Skills Like This screened worldwide on the film festival circuit prior to its American theatrical release by Shadow Distribution in 2009. The film received positive reviews from publications ranging from The New York Times and Variety  to Salon.com. In her review for The New York Times, Jeanette Catsoulis wrote, "the offbeat chemistry of the cast, along with Monty Miranda's eye-catching direction...make all the difference... Drawing much of its energy from an eclectic and fully integrated soundtrack, "Skills Like This" gazes indulgently on 20-something aimlessness and the comfort of assigned roles. In Mr. Miranda's hands sloth can be more appealing than you might think." Variety further stated that the main characters of Skills Like This showed "considerable intelligence and chemistry" in addition to calling the film "deftly directed"  and from Salon Andrew O'Heir reviewed "Skills Like This" as, "Cheerfully anarchic...indescribably genuine."  The film screened in theatrical release for four months.

References

External links
 
 
 IndieWire Interview with Director Monty Miranda
 San Francisco Chronicle Datebook Story
 Film Click Interview with Monty Miranda and Spencer Berger

2007 films
2007 comedy films
Films scored by Anthony Marinelli
2007 directorial debut films